Mic On is the twelfth extended play (EP) by South Korean girl group Mamamoo. It was released on October 11, 2022, through RBW. The EP consists of three tracks, including the lead single "Illella".

Composition
Mic On contains three songs. The EP opens with "1,2,3 Eoi!", a "masterful" track incorporating electronic and hip-hop elements, with the group's vocals, it adds a smooth, jazzy texture that complements the vocals in the chorus. Followed with the title track "Illella", it opens with "bright" ad libs and "rich" vocals over a powerful reggaeton instrumental mixed with guitar riffs and "resounding percussion" in its arrangement. The closing track "L.I.E.C." is a nu-disco song, NME noted that the song is similar in its production to the group's single "Um Oh Ah Yeh".

Track listing

Charts

Weekly charts

Monthly charts

References

2022 EPs
Kakao M EPs
Korean-language EPs
Mamamoo EPs